Yekaterina Ralifovna Salimova (Екатерина Ралифовна Салимова, born 2 April 1982) is a Russian former water polo player. She was a member of the Russia women's national water polo team, playing as a centre back.

She was a member of the  team at the 2004 Summer Olympics, and 2003 World Aquatics Championships.

On club level she played for Uralochka Zlatoust in Russia.

See also
 List of World Aquatics Championships medalists in water polo

References

External links
 

1982 births
Living people
Russian female water polo players
Water polo players at the 2004 Summer Olympics
Olympic water polo players of Russia
People from Zlatoust
Sportspeople from Chelyabinsk Oblast
21st-century Russian women